The Sony RX is the name of a range of digital cameras created by Sony in 2012.

Description
All cameras are equipped with Carl Zeiss lenses. The DSC-RX100 was designated one of 25 best inventions of the Year 2012 by Time.

0 Series

RX0 
The RX0 was released in 2017. It is a small, tough waterproof camera, with a 1" sensor. It has a 24mm f4 equivalent Zeiss Tessar T* wide angle lens.

RX0 II 
Released in 2019, the RX0 II has a tilt screen and built in 4K video recording technology.

1 Series

RX1 
The DSC-RX1 was released in late 2012.  It is an expert-level compact with a 24 megapixel  full size sensor (notably used by the Sony α99).  The sensitivity ranges from 100 to 25600 ISO. The lens has a focal length of 35 mm and aperture f/2. The camera has a 1,229,000 pixel screen of 7.5 cm diagonal.

RX1R 
Released in the summer of 2013, the RX1R is a derivative of DSC-RX1 without a low pass filter, as a full hybrid brand format, the Sony α7R.

RX1R II

10 Series

RX10 
The DSC-RX10 was released in late 2013. It is a bridge expert equipped with a 1" sensor (13.2 x 8.8mm) 20 megapixels, the sensitivity extends from 125 to 12800. (expandable to ISO 74) The zoom lens has an equivalent focal range of 24–200 mm (zoom 8.3x) and a maximum aperture of f/2.8 over the whole range. The device has a screen of 7.5 cm of diagonal and a resolution of 1,228,800 pixels.

RX10 II 
The DSC-RX10 II, marketed in July 2015, boasts a new faster sensor generation (Exmor RS) and the 4K video recording equipment. The autofocus was improved to 0.9 seconds on a moving object. The maximum shutter speed is 1/32000 seconds, the burst passes 16 i/s.

RX10 III 
In March 2016, Sony introduced the third version of its DSC-RX10 camera, the III. It features a much longer maximum focal length lens (24-600 equiv.), improved image stabilization and new buttons and controls.  It loses, however, the built-in ND filter of the RX10 II.

RX10 IV 
The RX10 IV was announced in September 2017. It is similar to the RX III but features a new sensor with on-sensor phase detect (for faster and better autofocus tracking) and the ability to shoot 24 frames per second (with autofocus tracking). It loses, however, the PlayMemories App features of the RX10 III.

Timeline

100 Series

RX100 
The DSC-RX100 was released in summer 2012.  It is a high-end compact with a 20 megapixel, 1" sensor (13.2 x 8.8mm) and 1080p video recording at 60 (NTSC) or 50 (PAL) frames per second.  The ISO sensitivity ranges from 80 to 6400 ISO.  The lens has an equivalent focal range  (3.6x) and an aperture of f/1.8–4.9. The device has a screen of 7.5 cm diagonal of 1230000. Its target price at launch was €650.

In 2013, Hasselblad launched Stellar, based on the RX100. It used specific materials such as leather or wood. It was a device designed for professionals working in luxury and fashion and with celebrities.

RX100 II 
The new version released in the summer of 2013. From an ergonomic point of view, this new model brings an ISO accessory shoe and a tilting screen. The technical developments concerning the sensor becomes backlit. The quality of low light images is thus improved as well as the reactivity (AF). The sensitivity range now extends from 100 to 12800 ISO. The Wi-Fi and NFC are integrated to control the camera with a smartphone through a dedicated application. 

The dimensions remain the same as the RX100, except in thickness where the Mark II takes about three millimeters. Its target price at launch was €750. 

On 26 November 2014, Hasselblad announced the Stellar II, based on the RX100 II. It is launched at €1,650, it replaces the first Stellar and offers several materials for grip: olive, drowning, padouk and carbon fiber.

RX100 III 
Announced on 15 May 2014 and marketed in July, this new version offers a wider aperture telephoto, f/2.8 instead of f/4.9. The focal range is modified to receive more wide angle, it is equivalent to 24–70 (2.9x zoom). A new version of the microprocessor BIONZ (referred to as "X") more powerful and faster born. The housing incorporates an electronic viewfinder pop-up (a definition identical to that of the Sony α6000), like a flash (the latter taking the place of the ISO label, which disappears). The sensitivity is further enhanced with a range of from 125 to 25600. The screen offers expanded orientation with an angle of 180° up and 45° down, in particular to promote selfies. The dimensions remain the same compared to the RX100 II, except thick where the Mark III takes about three millimeters. The RX100 III, sold at €850, does not replace the previous RX100 and stayed for sale at a reduced price allowing Sony to offer a range of expert compactcameras.

RX100 IV 

The RX100 IV was marketed in July 2015, it boasts a new faster sensor generation (Exmor RS) and 4K video. The autofocus progresses with 0.9 seconds on a moving object. The maximum shutter speed is 1/32000 s (electronic shutter), the speed priority continuous shooting mode averages 16 FPS.  The stacked sensor design supports High Frame Rate (HFR) in which the camera can record 3-7 secs of video at 960/1,000fps, 480/500fps, or 240/250fps (NTSC/PAL).  When played back at 1/40x rate, the result is super slow motion movies.

RX100 V 
On October 6, 2016, Sony announced the launch of RX100 V.

RX100 VI 
On June 5, 2018, Sony announced the RX100 VI.  It has double the telephoto capability of its predecessor with its 24-200mm f2.8-4.5 Carl Zeiss Vario-Sonnar T* lens.

RX100 VII 
On July 25, 2019, Sony announced the RX100 VII with a list price of $1,198 (US).  Physically it is almost identical to the RX100 VI, with the addition of a microphone socket.  The major improvement is a better auto-focus system.  The number of phase detect auto-focus points has increased from 315 covering 65% of the image to 357 covering 68%.  This supports Tracking Auto-focus and Eye Auto-focus on par with the Sony α9, Sony's top-of-the-line sports camera.  The continuous shooting rate is reduced from 24 fps in the RX100 VI to 20 fps, albeit without blackout.  A new short burst mode is introduced: a single press of the shutter release shoots 7 frames at 90 fps. Image stabilisation in video mode is improved.

Comparison

See also 
 Sony α
 Sony Mavica
 Cyber-shot

References

External links 
 Official website

Cyber-shot cameras